Farewell Spit is a narrow sand spit at the northern end of the Golden Bay, in the South Island of New Zealand. Farewell Spit is the longest sand spit in New Zealand, and is a legally protected Nature Reserve. The area is designated as a Ramsar wetland site and an East Asian–Australasian Flyway Shorebird Network site. Farewell Spit is administered by the New Zealand Department of Conservation as a seabird and wildlife reserve. Apart from a small area at the base of the spit, it is closed to the public except through organised tours.

Location
The small settlement of Pūponga is situated close to the western (landward) end of the spit.

Toponymy
The Māori name for the spit is Onetahua, translated as "heaped up sand".

Abel Tasman in 1642 was the first European to see the spit, calling it Sand Duining Hoeck. Captain James Cook was the next European visitor in 1770, showing Farewell Spit as a broad peninsula on his maps. He named close-by Cape Farewell, and the name stuck, with early European settlers originally calling the sandbanks 'Cape Farewell Spit' before it was shortened to its present name. It was the last land Cook sighted after leaving New Zealand for Australia at the end of his first voyage.

Geography

The spit runs from west to east, and is formed from fine golden-coloured quartz sands, derived from the erosion of granites and other rocks in the Southern Alps, and transported northwards along the West Coast by longshore drift with the Westland current.

The sand structures of Farewell Spit consist of two interacting systems. On the southern side of the spit there are older and relatively stable sand masses, separated by shallow lakes and swamps. On the northern side are more recent sand masses which undergo active erosion and accumulation as a result of winds and the deposition from the longshore current. Sand dunes known as barchans are formed on the spit because of the influence of winds predominantly from the west, and these dunes move in an easterly direction. The downwind face is steep and has a crescent shape.

The northern side of the dunes are steeper and unstable being constantly exposed to the prevailing winds which average over 25 km/h. The southern side which faces Golden Bay is more stable and largely covered with vegetation. The tide here can recede as much as seven kilometres exposing some 80 square kilometres of mud flats; a rich feeding ground for the many seabirds in the area but also a trap for frequently stranded whales.

Protected area
Farewell Spit is a legally protected area of Crown property, and is classified as a Nature Reserve under s20 of the Reserves Act 1977. The spit was originally established as Flora and Fauna Reserve in 1938. In 1980, the status was altered to Nature Reserve, and the adjacent inter-tidal zone designated as a Wildlife Sanctuary.

Farewell Spit was designated as a Wetland of International Importance under the Ramsar Convention in 1976, when the convention came into effect in New Zealand. In 2000, to recognise the importance of the site to migratory birds, Farewell Spit was designated an East Asian–Australasian Flyway Shorebird Network Site. New Zealand became a partner in the East Asian – Australasian Flyway Partnership (EAAFP) in September 2011.

Birds
Farewell Spit provides a wide variety of habitat for birds, including ocean sand beaches, bare and vegetated sand dunes, salt marshes, and lakes both freshwater and brackish. These habitats support internationally important numbers of bar-tailed godwit, red knot, ruddy turnstone and banded dotterel, as well as the endemic variable and South Island pied oystercatchers. The dunes at the end of the spit support the only sea-level colony of Australasian gannets in the world. The eelgrass (Zostera) beds on the tidal flats are used by the largest moulting population of black swans in New Zealand.

Shorebirds
A study of shorebirds in the top of the South Island, commissioned by the Nelson City and Tasman District councils, was published in 2013. This study reported that from 2006 to 2009, the population of coastal shorebirds found in the estuaries in the top of the South Island represented between 14 and 22% of the total New Zealand shorebird population. Over the period of one year, between 45% and 66% of shorebirds in the study region were found at Farewell Spit. During summer, there is an average of about 29,000 shorebirds at Farewell Spit, representing 10.2% of the national population. During winter (June), there is an average of 8,500 birds, representing 6.5% of the national population, and in spring (November) there is an average of 20,000, representing 13.2% of the national population. Farewell Spit typically has more than 20,000 shorebirds present during summer and spring, and this meets the criteria for recognition under Ramsar Convention Criterion 5 as a wetland site of international importance.

During spring and summer, migratory waders make up a large proportion of the shorebirds at Farewell Spit (up to 93% during spring). Farewell Spit is a site of international importance for migratory bar-tailed godwits. Surveys have found an average of 11,872 godwits are present in the summer period, representing 9.1% of the total estimated numbers of this species in the flyway. 

Farewell Spit is also of international importance for shorebirds such as the South Island pied oyster-catcher. Surveys have found an average of 6,980 of these birds during summer, representing 7% of the estimated national population. The spit is also an important wintering area and a site of international importance for the banded dotterel.

Australasian gannets
A breeding colony of Australasian gannets was identified at Farewell Spit in 1983. The size of the colony increased from 75 nests in 1983 to 3,060 nests in 2001, and a 2006 survey recorded 3,300 pairs. The breeding area comprises several discrete sub-colonies at the end of the spit, around 30 minutes walk past the lighthouse. They are only a few metres above sea level. This gannet breeding area is unusual because other gannet colonies are well above sea level on high, stable rock formations. In January 1997, three of the sub-colonies were completely washed away during Cyclone Drena. In most years, some of the colonies are washed over during very high tides or major storms.

Other seabirds
Other seabirds that nest on shellbanks on Farewell Spit include Caspian terns and white-fronted terns.

Waterfowl
Farewell Spit has been identified as the largest moulting site for black swans in the country, with up to 15% of the total population present between November and March. Significant numbers of Australasian shoveler have also been reported.

Conservation initiatives

Farewell Spit was leased for grazing from around the 1850s, and extensive damage to vegetation was caused by grazing and fires. In 1938, the area was given protection and designated as a sanctuary. However, wild cattle remained in the area, and 258 were removed in the 1970s.

The adjoining Puponga Farm was originally purchased by the Crown to serve primarily as a buffer zone to protect the Farewell Spit Nature Reserve. Later purchases of Whararaki and Cape Farewell Farms helped to create a viable farm management unit, conserve biological and landscape values, and provide opportunities for public recreation. Puponga Farm Park serves as a visitor management and servicing area for the Farewell Spit Nature Reserve .

As at 2021, there are still feral pigs on Farewell Spit, and these animals are a significant threat to nesting birds.

The project is a joint initiative between HealthPost Nature Trust, Tasman Environmental Trust and Manawhenua ki Mohua.

Lighthouse

The Farewell Spit Lighthouse at the end of the spit was first lit on 17 June 1870 in response to many ships having been wrecked upon the spit. The original timber tower did not stand up well to the frequent blasting by the sand and salt-laden winds experienced at the end of the spit. The hardwood used started to decay rapidly and the original tower was replaced in 1897 by the present structure, the only steel latticework lighthouse in New Zealand.

The foundations of the lighthouse are only just above sea level, so the lighthouse tower has to be taller than usual for other lighthouses around New Zealand's coast. The light was fully automated and the last lighthouse keeper was withdrawn in 1984. The lighthouse keeper's house and two accommodation buildings are still being maintained for use by the Department of Conservation, Maritime New Zealand, and tour groups.

Tourism
Four-wheel drive bus tours from Collingwood or Pūponga operated by concession-holders include the opportunity to jump off a sand dune, a visit to the lighthouse and the gannet colony.

Shipwrecks

Farewell Spit has been the site of many shipwrecks and vessel strandings, particularly in the era of merchant sailing vessels. Most of these incidents occurred when a vessel became grounded on sand in shallow water near the Spit either through navigational errors or being driven ashore in adverse weather. Particularly notable losses include the  that ran aground off Farewell Spit in 1877 and the  that was sunk by a mine 17 km off the spit in 1917.

Whale stranding

Farewell Spit has been the location of many herd strandings of long-finned pilot whales, and has been described as a ‘whale trap’, because of its protruding coastlines and long, gently sloping beaches.

References

Sources

External links

 Map of Farewell Spit at Ramsar.org
 Farewell Spit and Puponga Farm Park at the Department of Conservation
 Farewell Spit Nature Reserve and Puponga Farm Management Plan (1990) at the Department of Conservation
 Farewell Spit Tours concession holder website
 Onetahua Restoration pest-free project website

Landforms of the Tasman District
Ramsar sites in New Zealand
Spits of New Zealand
Transport buildings and structures in the Tasman District
Golden Bay
Lighthouses in New Zealand
Protected areas of the Tasman District
Nature reserves in New Zealand